The Aberdeen School District is a public school district based in Aberdeen, Monroe County, Mississippi (USA).

Schools
Aberdeen High School (Mississippi)|Aberdeen High School (Grades 9-12)
Shivers Middle School (Grades 6-8)
Belle Elementary School (Grades 4-5)
Aberdeen Elementary School (Grades PK-3)
Aberdeen Learning Center

Demographics

2006-07 school year
There were a total of 1,594 students enrolled in the Aberdeen School District during the 2006–2007 school year. The gender makeup of the district was 48% female and 52% male. The racial makeup of the district was 93.41% African American, 5.33% White, 0.82% Hispanic, and 0.44% Asian. 89.5% of the district's students were eligible to receive free lunch.

Previous school years

Accountability statistics

See also
List of school districts in Mississippi

References

External links
 

Education in Monroe County, Mississippi
School districts in Mississippi